Amersfoort  may refer to:

 Amersfoort, a city in the Netherlands
 Amersfoort, Mpumalanga, a town in South Africa
 The Amersfoort concentration camp
 New Amersfoort, a town in New Netherland